Al-Mansurah Subdistrict or Al-Mansurah Nahiyah  is a Syrian Nahiyah (Subdistrict) located in Al-Thawrah District in Raqqa, situated south-west of Raqqa and the Euphrates river. According to the Syria Central Bureau of Statistics (CBS), Al-Mansurah Subdistrict had a population of 58,727 in the 2004 census.

Al-Mansurah Subdistrict is bounded by the Euphrates river and the small Al-Thawrah subdistrict to the north and Sabka subdistrict also of Raqqa Governorate to the west.

The administrative centre Al-Mansurah and much of the north of the subdistrict are currently controlled by SDF and the Tabqa civilian council, following three years of control by ISIS and other rebel groups.
While the south of the subdistrict is currently under the control of the People's council of Syria government in Damascus.

References 

Subdistricts of Raqqa Governorate